Clarence Lidington (November 7, 1880 – February 20, 1940) was an American gymnast. He competed in four events at the 1904 Summer Olympics.

References

External links
 

1880 births
1940 deaths
American male artistic gymnasts
Olympic gymnasts of the United States
Gymnasts at the 1904 Summer Olympics
Gymnasts from Toronto
Canadian emigrants to the United States